Maxillaria sophronitis, the sophronitis-like maxillaria, is a species of orchid found in Venezuela and northeastern Colombia.

References

External links 

sophronitis
Orchids of Colombia
Orchids of Venezuela